Purlewaugh is a locality in the Warrumbungle Shire, New South Wales, Australia.

References

Localities in New South Wales
Warrumbungle Shire